Compsosoma is a genus of longhorn beetles of the subfamily Lamiinae.

 Compsosoma alboapicalis Breuning, 1980
 Compsosoma chabrillacii Thomson, 1857
 Compsosoma fasciatum Monné, 1980
 Compsosoma geayi Gounelle, 1908
 Compsosoma mniszechii Thomson, 1857
 Compsosoma monnei Martins & Galileo, 1996
 Compsosoma mutillarium (Klug, 1825)
 Compsosoma nubilum Gounelle, 1908
 Compsosoma perpulchrum (Vigors, 1825)
 Compsosoma phaleratum Thomson, 1857
 Compsosoma v-notatum (Vigors, 1825)
 Compsosoma vestitipenne Zajciw, 1962

References

Compsosomatini
Cerambycidae genera